Gyula Kunszt (31 July 1903 – 22 December 1991) was a Hungarian gymnast. He competed in seven events at the 1928 Summer Olympics.

References

1903 births
1991 deaths
Hungarian male artistic gymnasts
Olympic gymnasts of Hungary
Gymnasts at the 1928 Summer Olympics
Gymnasts from Budapest